Maria Chona (1845-1936) was a native American weaver and participant in anthropological research.

Life 
Maria Chona was born in 1845 on the Tohono O’odham reservation in what is now Arizona. Chona's Father José María was a leader within their community. In her childhood Chona learnt to weave, and became an accomplished basket weaver. In her early teens Chona was married off to the son of a medicine man, to whom she had a daughter. Becoming unhappy after her husband took another wife, Chona divorced him and returned to live with her parents. Upon remarrying, Chona moved to Tucson and had two sons.

Anthropology involvement 
In the 1930s Chona participated in Ruth Murray Underhill's research on the culture and lifestyle of the Tohono O'odham people. Underhill saw parallels between their lives, with both of them being divorced women working within what she saw a patriarchal societies. Because of this Underhill posited that Chona was a feminist. Author Liz Sonneborn notes that Underhill's research on Native American women is a unique contrast to other research at the time which predominantly focused on men, saying "these stories quietly detail the trials and triumphs of everyday life and the network of personal relationships Indian women traditionally had relied upon for their survival." Underhill helped Chona to publish her life story, "The Autobiography of a Papago Woman" - making her the first Southwestern Indian woman to do so.

Works 
 The Autobiography of a Papago Woman (1936)

References 

1845 births
1936 deaths
Tohono O'odham people
20th-century American women artists
Native American women artists
Women basketweavers
Basket weavers
Native American basket weavers
20th-century Native Americans
20th-century Native American women
Artists from Arizona
Native American people from Arizona